Battleswarm: Field of Honor was a free-to-play first-person shooter/real-time strategy video game developed by Game World Tech. Battleswarm featured an item mall which used Reality Gap's e-currency called 'MetaTIX'. Battleswarm was officially launched on November 19, 2009.

On July 1, 2011, Reality Gap announced they were to shut down game servers, while 'in the process of a sale to a new company who specializes in children's games'. On July 16, 2011, the game servers were officially shut down.

Plot
Battleswarm takes place on a foreign planet during a catastrophic war between humans, and a race of giant bugs.

Gameplay
Battleswarm had a unique gameplay concept which pitted two genres of gameplay against one another. The human side was played as a first- or third-person shooter, while the bugs were commanded in the style of a real-time strategy game.

The game had both PvP and PvE gameplay, and had a large selection of game types and maps.

References

External links

Inactive multiplayer online games
2009 video games
First-person shooters
Free online games
Windows games
Windows-only games
Products and services discontinued in 2011